Stanislav Andreev (Uzbek Cyrillic: Станислав Андреев; born 6 May 1988 in Tashkent) is a footballer from Uzbekistan. He usually plays as a defensive midfielder. He currently plays for Metallurg Bekabad in the Uzbek League. He was a member of the Uzbekistan squad at the 2011 Asian Cup.

Career
He has played for Pakhtakor Tashkent since 2007. He has been loaned to Metallurg Bekabad in 2018 for half season.

International career
Andreev played for national team in 2011 AFC Asian Cup.

International goals
Scores and results list Uzbekistan's goal tally first.

Honours

Club

 Uzbek League (3): 2007, 2012, 2014, 2015
 Uzbek League runners-up (3): 2008, 2009, 2010
 Uzbek Cup (3): 2007, 2009, 2011

International
 AFC Asian Cup 4th:  2011

References

External links
Goal Profile

1988 births
Living people
Sportspeople from Tashkent
Association football midfielders
Uzbekistani footballers
Uzbekistan international footballers
Pakhtakor Tashkent FK players
2011 AFC Asian Cup players
Uzbekistani people of Russian descent
PFK Metallurg Bekabad players